Simon Bowman (born 16 February 1961) is a British actor and singer, born in Cardiff and trained at Mountview Theatre School. He is best known for originating the role of Chris, opposite Lea Salonga's Kim, in the original production of Miss Saigon at Theatre Royal Drury Lane in the West End.

Prior to that, he was Marius in Cameron Mackintosh/RSC's production of Les Misérables at the Palace Theatre, returning there 14 years later in the role of Jean Valjean. After the success of Miss Saigon, he then played Raoul and then The Phantom in Andrew Lloyd Webber’s The Phantom of the Opera at Her Majesty's Theatre, London. He recently reprised the role of Jean Valjean on the West End at the Queen's Theatre. Bowman also performed with Alfie Boe, Colm Wilkinson and John Owen-Jones in the 25th Anniversary Concert of Les Misérables. They sang the song "Bring Him Home" as a quartet in the Finale' of the concert.

He shot to fame in 1983 as Young Elvis in Alan Bleasdale's hit musical Are You Lonesome Tonight? In 2006, he played the rock star again in This is Elvis and played a dentist in the BBC One series Doctors.

In 2009, Bowman released a CD, One Night With You featuring songs from his career in the West End.

He performed with Alfie Boe, Colm Wilkinson and John Owen-Jones as part of the 'Valjean Quartet' on 16 December 2010, at the Royal Variety Performance; once again singing "Bring Him Home".

As part of the 25th anniversary of The Phantom of the Opera, Simon performed the title song at The Royal Variety Performance - held in The Lowry, Manchester - on 5 December 2011. Performing alongside Nicole Scherzinger, Bowman was joined by three other former Phantoms (Ramin Karimloo, Earl Carpenter and John Owen-Jones). The performance was aired on ITV1 on Wednesday 14 December 2011.

References

External links
Official Site
British Theatre Guide
Stars of West End
Implant dentar
BBC interview on "This is Elvis"
Milton Keynes Theatre: This Is Elvis
Enwau mawr i Wyl y Faenol#1 Custom Signs Glenview, KY | Specialty Signage & Graphics Near Me
londonmusicalsONLINE

British male musical theatre actors
British male singers
Living people
Male actors from Cardiff
1961 births